Ouija: Origin of Evil is a 2016 American supernatural horror film directed and edited by Mike Flanagan and written by Flanagan and Jeff Howard. The film is a prequel to the 2014 film Ouija and stars Elizabeth Reaser, Annalise Basso, and Henry Thomas. A widow and her family introduce a Ouija board into their phony seance business, thereby inviting a spirit that possesses the youngest daughter.

Ouija: Origin of Evil was released in the United States on October 21, 2016, by Universal Pictures. The film grossed over $81 million worldwide and received positive reviews from critics, with many praising it as a significant improvement over its predecessor.

Plot 

In 1967  Los Angeles, a young widow named Alice Zander works out of her suburban home as a spiritual medium, accompanied by her daughters, 15-year-old Paulina "Lina" and 9-year-old Doris. The family is reeling over the recent death of Roger, Alice's husband and the kids' father. Alice incorporates a Ouija board into her readings and unknowingly contacts a spirit named Marcus that begins to possess Doris.

Alice receives notice that the bank intends to foreclose on their home. Doris contacts the board for help, believing she is communicating with her dead father. The spirit leads her to a secret compartment in the basement wall containing a pouch of cash. When she gives the money to her mother, the family has a Ouija session. When the board answers a question only Roger would know the answer to, a thrilled Alice begins believing that they are in contact with him.

Soon, Doris becomes fully possessed by the spirit. Lina, disturbed by the changes in her sister, finds papers written by Doris in fluent Polish, a language she does not know, and brings them to Father Tom Hogan, her school principal. Troubled, Father Tom visits them for a Ouija session under the pretense of contacting his dead wife Gloria. He later explains to them that Doris did not contact Gloria. Instead, for every question he asked, she read his thoughts and repeated the answers he was thinking in his mind. The pages are entries written by a Polish immigrant named Marcus, who was taken captive during World War II by a sadistic doctor who conducted experiments on him and other captives in the house's basement. These spirits have been watching the family since the day they moved in.

Doris kills Lina's new boyfriend Mikey when he comes to visit. Father Tom, Alice, and Lina burn the Ouija board; Father Tom finds the secret room where the experiments were conducted, and is possessed by the spirits, only to be killed later by Doris. Alice is captured, while Roger's spirit carries an unconscious Lina to her bed. Recalling earlier when her doll's mouth was stitched shut by her father's spirit "to shut out the voices" for Doris, Lina realizes she must sew Doris' mouth shut to quiet the spirits' voices. She sews Doris' mouth shut but kills Doris in the process.

Doris wakes up as a ghost and is happily reunited with her father. The spirits possess Lina and stab Alice. Alice tells Lina that it was not her fault before dying, leaving Lina devastated. Lina is committed in a mental hospital for the suspected murder of her mother and disappearance of her sister. Alone in her room, she creates a Ouija board on the floor with her blood and tries to summon Doris but summons an evil spirit in Doris’ form instead.

In a post-credits scene, 47 years later in 2014, a now elderly and still institutionalized Lina receives a visit from someone claiming to be her niece.

Cast 

 Elizabeth Reaser as Alice Zander
 Annalise Basso as Paulina "Lina" Zander
 Lin Shaye as Old Paulina Zander
 Lulu Wilson as Doris Zander
 Henry Thomas as Father Thomas “Tom” Hogan
 Parker Mack as Michael "Mikey" Russell
 Kate Siegel as Jenny Browning
 Doug Jones as Ghoul Marcus
 Halle Charlton as Ellie
 Alexis G. Zall as Betty
 Sam Anderson as Mr. Browning
 Ele Keats as Ellie's Mom
 Nicholas Keenan as Walter
 Michael Weaver as Roger Zander
 Umran Mustafa as Keith Hemmingway

Production 
Although the first film in the Ouija series was a success commercially, its critical reception was less than stellar. As a result, Jason Blum wanted to make a film that was significantly different from the original. This appealed to director Mike Flanagan who stated in an interview that he has an "allergy to sequels". Blum let Flanagan work on the type of horror film he wanted which was a period piece that dealt with a family dynamic. There was some talk from the beginning about whether or not the film should have any connections at all to the original, but Flanagan himself was opposed to this, and instead opted to make subtle references to the original to welcome new viewers while also entertaining fans of the original.

The 1980 movie The Changeling was an influence on the film. Flanagan screened the earlier film for his director of photography "like ten times". He watched such horror classics as The Exorcist and The Watcher in the Woods. It was then that the pair hit off the idea to film the movie as if it were made during the 1970s, using only technology that would only have been available at the time.

Production in Los Angeles commenced in September 2015 and wrapped in October 2015. The main cast was announced in September 2015 with principal photography beginning that same month, which ran to October 21, 2015. Post-production on the film began on October 31, 2015.

Universal Pictures used its 1963–90 logo, designed by Universal Title and Optical for MCA Inc., to open and promote the film.

Soundtrack
The Newton Brothers (replacing Anton Sanko, who composed the first film) composed the prequel. The soundtrack was released by Back Lot Music on October 21, 2016.

Release 
In April 2015, it was announced that the film would be released on October 21, 2016.

Box office
Ouija: Origin of Evil grossed $35.1 million in North America and $46.6 million in other territories for a worldwide total of $81.7 million, against a budget of $12 million.

The film opened alongside Boo! A Madea Halloween, Keeping Up with the Joneses, Jack Reacher: Never Go Back, and I'm Not Ashamed, and was expected to gross around $15 million from about 3,168 theaters in its opening weekend. It ended up grossing $14.1 million (compared to its predecessor's $19.9 debut), finishing third at the box office.

Critical response
On Rotten Tomatoes, the film has an approval rating of 83% based on reviews from 126 critics, with an average rating of 6.4/10, making it one of the highest-rated films to date produced by either Hasbro Studios or Platinum Dunes. The website's critics consensus reads, "Ouija: Origin of Evil swerves its franchise's planchette unexpectedly to YES with a surprisingly scary and dramatically satisfying follow-up to its lackluster predecessor." On Metacritic, it has a weighted average score of 65 out of 100 based on reviews from 26 critics, indicating "generally favorable reviews". Audiences polled by CinemaScore gave the film an average grade of "C" on an A+ to F scale, the same as its predecessor.

Katie Rife for The A.V. Club gave the film a B and wrote that compared to its predecessor "It is better, though, in every conceivable way, from casting to story to atmosphere." Odie Henderson for RogerEbert.com gave the film three stars and called it "one overstuffed horror movie recipe, with a dash of The Exorcist and a spritz of Ghost among its tasty ingredients." Adam Dileo of IGN said "Ouija: Origin of Evil may just be the latest entrant into that small category of sequels and prequels that manage to improve upon their predecessors in every way." Kate Erbland of IndieWire called the film "genuinely frightening and smart, the rare horror prequel able to stand on its own merits and deliver a full-bodied story that succeeds without any previous knowledge or trappings."

Jimmy Champagne of Bloody Disgusting called it "easily Flanagan’s best film yet" and said "Ouija: Origin of Evil is a heartfelt and genuinely frightening experience."

References

External links 
 
 
 

2016 films
2016 horror films
2016 horror thriller films
American ghost films
American supernatural horror films
American horror thriller films
American horror drama films
Blumhouse Productions films
Hasbro Studios films
Platinum Dunes films
Universal Pictures films
Films about board games
Films based on games
Films directed by Mike Flanagan
Films produced by Michael Bay
Films produced by Jason Blum
Films produced by Andrew Form
Films produced by Bradley Fuller
Films scored by the Newton Brothers
Films set in Los Angeles
Films set in 1967
Films set in 2014
Films based on Hasbro toys
Matricide in fiction
Sororicide in fiction
2010s supernatural horror films
Films produced by Brian Goldner
2010s English-language films
2010s American films
American prequel films